Springville is the name of some places in the United States of America:

Springville, Alabama
Springville, California
Springville, California, former name of Fortuna, California
Springville, California, former town in what is now western Camarillo, California
Springville, Georgia, former name of Powder Springs
Springville, Indiana (disambiguation) (three different places)
Springville, Iowa
Springville, Massachusetts, former name of the village of Metcalf in Holliston, Massachusetts
Springville, New York
Springville, Seneca County, Ohio
Springville, Wayne County, Ohio
Springville, South Carolina
Springville, Tennessee
Springville, Utah, the largest city with the name
Springville, Wisconsin, a town
Springville, Vernon County, Wisconsin, an unincorporated community
Springville Township, Michigan
Springville Township, Pennsylvania